Pettit is a small unincorporated community in Perry Township, Tippecanoe County, Indiana, located east by northeast of Dayton.

The community is part of the Lafayette, Indiana Metropolitan Statistical Area.

History

A post office was established at Pettit in 1854, and remained in operation until it was discontinued in 1902.

Geography
Pettit is located in Perry Township at an elevation of 673 feet.

References

WP:USCITY

Unincorporated communities in Tippecanoe County, Indiana
Unincorporated communities in Indiana
Lafayette metropolitan area, Indiana